Doug Heveron (born March 29, 1961) is an American race car driver from Liverpool, New York. He has driven supermodifieds, modifieds, Indy cars, NASCAR Winston Cup cars, NASCAR Busch Grand National cars, sprint cars, late models and midgets.

Doug Heveron is the son of Gail and Tom Heveron. Tom was an Oswego Speedway Hall of Fame member. In 1969 Heveron began racing at the Syracuse Geddes Microd Track at the New York State Fairgrounds when he was 8 years old. When he was 13 years old, Heveron started racing quarter midgets. When he was attending Liverpool High School, he spent time helping regionally known racer Jim Shampine at Shampine Auto Parts.

He entered the supermodified ranks in 1978 in one of Shampine's cars known as the "8 ball". Heveron used the car to become the youngest winner at Oswego Speedway in the Alean 75. He won the International Supermodified Association (ISMA) Rookie of the Year Award that year. Heveron became the dominant driver at Oswego. He won 13 races in 1981, the Oswego International Classic in 1981 and 1982, and track championships both years. Heveron was the champion of the ISMA tour series from 1978 until 1981.

In 1983 he drove in the CART Championship Car race at Atlanta Motor Speedway and finished 12th, he then prepared to qualify for the 1983 Indianapolis 500. He spun the car into a wall and shattered his ankle. Between 1983 and 1986 he raced in NASCAR's Winston Cup series. He qualified in the only field in Talladega Superspeedway history in which every car qualified with a speed in excess of 200 miles per hour. He raced in 31 races, with no top-10 finishes. Heveron is best known for flipping over in turn one at the 1984 Firecracker 400, which brought out the final caution to set up an exciting finish with Richard Petty and Cale Yarborough, Petty beat Cale en route to his 200th win. Heveron's best year was 1986, when he finished 35th in points.

After his NASCAR team ran out of money, he returned to modified racing. In 1989 he set a new track record, starting on the pole position as a rookie in the Little 500, the USAC sprint car championship. He returned to racing in Oswego in May 1989.

From 1994 until 1997, Heveron raced in NASCAR, this time racing in the Busch Series. He found more success in NASCAR's second-tier circuit, with five top-10 and three top-5 finishes in 65 starts. His best result was a second-place finish at Nazareth Speedway in 1995.

From 2000 until 2002, Heveron raced in the TBARA Winged Sprint asphalt racing series. He then starting racing for Heckman Motorsports, living in Jensen Beach, Florida.

Awards
Heveron has been inducted in three halls of fame: the Quarter Midget of America (1990) and the Greater Syracuse Sports Hall of Fame (2004). Oswego Speedway Hall of Fame

Motorsports career results

American open-wheel racing
(key) (Races in bold indicate pole position)

CART PPG Indy Car World Series

Indianapolis 500

NASCAR
(key) (Bold – Pole position awarded by qualifying time. Italics – Pole position earned by points standings or practice time. * – Most laps led.)

Winston Cup Series

Daytona 500

Busch Series

References

External links
Website

1961 births
Living people
NASCAR drivers
Champ Car drivers
People from Liverpool, New York
Racing drivers from New York (state)
People from Jensen Beach, Florida